Luo Jing (Chinese: 罗竞; born 14 November 1993 in Guiyang) is a Chinese professional footballer who currently plays for Chinese Super League club Cangzhou Mighty Lions.

Club career
Luo Jing joined Hangzhou Greentown youth team system from Shenzhen Yantian Sports School in 2006. He became one of players in the football star project and went to Portugal for football training in 2011. After training with Alverca for half year, he signed a contract with Oliveirense in the summer of 2012 and then was loaned to Terceira Divisão side Casa Pia for 2012/13 season. In July 2013, Luo returned to Hangzhou Greentown and was promoted to the first team squad. On 21 September 2013, he made his Super League debut in a game against Wuhan Zall that saw Hangzhou 1–1, coming on as a substitute for Gao Di in the 55th minute. On 26 April 2014, he scored his first goal for Hangzhou, which ensured Hangzhou tied with Jiangsu Sainty 2–2. Luo scored two goals in twenty-one appearances in the 2014 season and was named as the young player of the year by Hangzhou Greentown. He was sent to the Greentown reserved team in 2018.

On 16 February 2019, Luo transferred to Super League side Jiangsu Suning, signing a four-year contract. He would make his debut in a league game on 31 March 2019, against Wuhan Zall in 2-1 defeat. He would go on to establish himself as a regular within the team and in the following season he would win the clubs first league title with them.

Career statistics
Statistics accurate as of match played 3 January 2022.

Honours

Club
Jiangsu Suning
Chinese Super League: 2020

References

External links
 

1993 births
Living people
Chinese footballers
Footballers from Guizhou
Zhejiang Professional F.C. players
Jiangsu F.C. players
Chinese expatriate footballers
Expatriate footballers in Portugal
Chinese expatriate sportspeople in Portugal
Chinese Super League players
China League One players
China League Two players
Association football midfielders